Steven Alan Schaick (born June 7, 1958) is a retired major general in the United States Air Force, and an ordained Presbyterian minister, who last served as the 19th Chief of Chaplains of the United States Air Force. He previously served as the 25th Deputy Chief of Chaplains of the United States Air Force, Headquarters U. S. Air Force, Pentagon, Washington, D.C. As the deputy chief of chaplains, he was a member of the special staff of the Chief of Staff, Schaick assists the Chief of Chaplains of the United States Air Force in establishing guidance on all matters pertaining to the religious and moral welfare of Air Force personnel and their dependents and directing and maintaining a trained, equipped and professional Chaplain Corps of more than 2,200 chaplains and chaplain assistants from the active and Air Reserve components.  As a member of the Armed Forces Chaplains Board, he and other members advise the Secretary of Defense and Joint Chiefs of Staff on religious, ethical and quality-of-life concerns.

Schaick is a native of Oshkosh, Wisconsin, and enlisted in the U.S. Air Force in 1976 serving four years as an F-15 Integrated Avionics Component Specialist.  He was commissioned in the Air Force Reserves as a chaplain candidate in 1985 and into the active duty chaplaincy in 1988. Schaick served three different major commands as a staff chaplain, followed by special duty assignment to Arlington National Cemetery.  He led a division in the Center for Character Development at the U.S. Air Force Academy and went on to serve as a wing chaplain in Air Force Special Operations Command. Schaick served as the deputy command chaplain for both Air Force Special Operations Command and Air Combat Command. He served as the Senior Staff Chaplain for the Air Force Intelligence, Surveillance and Reconnaissance Agency and the command chaplain for Air Education and Training Command.  An ordained Presbyterian minister, Schaick is endorsed by the Presbyterian Church, USA.

In December 2019, Schaick was appointed the first Chief of Chaplains of the United States Space Force.

Awards and decorations

References

|-

|-

1958 births
Living people
Deputy Chiefs of Chaplains of the United States Air Force
United States Air Force generals
Presbyterian Church (USA) teaching elders
Recipients of the Legion of Merit
People from Oshkosh, Wisconsin
Religious leaders from Wisconsin
Military personnel from Wisconsin
University of Wisconsin–Oshkosh alumni
McCormick Theological Seminary alumni
Webster University alumni
Fuller Theological Seminary alumni
Squadron Officer School alumni
Air Command and Staff College alumni
Air War College alumni